Scopula shiskensis is a moth of the  family Geometridae. It is found on Sakhalin.

References

Moths described in 1925
shiskensis
Moths of Asia